The Serie B 1955–56 was the twenty-fourth tournament of this competition played in Italy since its creation.

Teams
Bari and Livorno had been promoted from Serie C, while Udinese and Catania had been relegated from Serie A.

Final classification

Results

References and sources
Almanacco Illustrato del Calcio - La Storia 1898-2004, Panini Edizioni, Modena, September 2005

Serie B seasons
2
Italy